Cavichona is a genus of ciliates in the family Spirochonidae.

References

External links 

 

Ciliate genera
Phyllopharyngea